Saul Henry "Rareback" Davis (February 22, 1901 – February 8, 1994) was an American baseball shortstop in the Negro leagues. He played from 1921 to 1931 with several teams.

References

External links
 and Seamheads

1901 births
1994 deaths
Birmingham Black Barons players
Cleveland Tigers (baseball) players
Columbus Buckeyes players
Detroit Stars players
Chicago American Giants players
Memphis Red Sox players
People from Monticello, Arkansas
Baseball players from Arkansas
Baseball shortstops
People from Minot, North Dakota
20th-century African-American sportspeople